Emma Raven (née Lloyd, born 1967) is a British chemist and chemical biologist. She is a Professor of Chemistry and Head of the School of Chemistry at the University of Bristol. She was previously a Professor at the University of Leicester. Her research work is concerned with the role of heme in biology, in particular on the mechanism of action, structures and biological function of heme proteins.

Biography 
Emma was born in Northamptonshire and was educated in state schools at Ruskin Junior and then Weavers School. She obtained a first class degree in Chemistry from the University of Leicester in 1988. She subsequently moved to Newcastle University when she obtained her PhD in 1991, supervised by A Geoffrey Sykes, FRS.

Career 
With encouragement from A G Sykes, in 1992 she moved to the University of British Columbia where she worked with A G Mauk and Michael Smith, FRS. In 1994, she was offered a lectureship at the University of Leicester, where she worked for 23 years. In 2018, she moved to the University of Bristol.

Awards and honours 
Emma is a Fellow of the Royal Society of Chemistry (FRSC). She has received several awards from the Royal Society of Chemistry, including the Inorganic Biochemistry Award (2005), the Reaction Kinetics and Mechanism Award (2008), and the Interdisplinary Prize (2020). She also received a Royal Society Wolfson Award in 2017. She has been the recipient of research fellowships from the Wellcome Trust (2001), the Leverhulme Trust (2005, 2017) and the BBSRC (2006, 2013). She has served as President of the Royal Society of Chemistry Dalton (Inorganic) Division (2016-2018).

Family 
Emma married Neil Raven in 1998. She has two younger brothers, both of them scientists; one of them, Daniel Lloyd, is a professor at the University of Kent.

References 

British women scientists
British women chemists
British women biologists
British chemists
British biologists
1967 births
Living people